Helali may refer to:
 Halali, Mashhad
 Helali, Nishapur
 Helali District, in Razavi Khorasan Province

See also
 Halali (disambiguation)